Montevecchia is a comune (municipality) in the Province of Lecco in the Italian region Lombardy, located about  northeast of Milan and about  south of Lecco.

Montevecchia borders the following municipalities: Cernusco Lombardone, Merate, Missaglia, Olgiate Molgora, Osnago, Perego and Rovagnate.

Demographic Evolution

References

Cities and towns in Lombardy